Walter Frank Hermann Wolff (May 11, 1928 – December 12, 1971) was an American actor whose film career began with roles in five 1958–61 Roger Corman productions and ended a decade later in Rome, after many appearances in European-made films, most of which were lensed in Italy.

Early life 
A native of San Francisco, California, Wolff was the son of a Bay Area physician. Both parents were of German descent. The elder Wolff, a political and social maverick, encouraged young Frank to follow an unconventional path. He attended University of California, Los Angeles, where he studied acting and stagecraft, wrote and directed plays and befriended another actor/director, Monte Hellman. Between 1957 and 1961, he appeared in nearly 20 episodes of TV series and feature films, a few of which fit into the horror/science fiction genre.

Career with Roger Corman 
Wolff had bit roles in his first two films, Roger Corman's I Mobster and The Wasp Woman. The former, a 1958 black-and-white gangster melodrama in which Wolff does not even receive a billing, was presented as a first-person narrative by the title character, Murder, Inc. (fictional) boss Joe Sante (Steve Cochran). The latter, Wolff's first genre film, was a typically campy horror, filmed in 1959, in which the owner of a cosmetics business (Susan Cabot) becomes the titular monster after using one of her own experimental rejuvenating formulas. Wolff has a single, memorable scene.

Later in the year, however, Wolff's billing dramatically increased to co-lead status in his next two Corman productions, scripted by Charles B. Griffith, Beast from Haunted Cave and Ski Troop Attack. Shot back-to-back in the snowy wilderness outside Deadwood, South Dakota, the films used the same crew and cast, which, in addition to Wolff, included Michael Forest, Wally Campo, Richard Sinatra (Frank's nephew) and Sheila Carol. The first of the two, Beast, directed for Corman by Wolff's UCLA friend, Monte Hellman, remains a well-remembered low-budget horror title, with a spider-like creature menacing a trio of robbers, led by Wolff, trapped in a ski lodge. In contrast, the equally poverty-budgeted Attack, on which Corman himself took over the directorial reins, turned out to be a little-noticed World War II quickie in which a quartet of GIs on skis slog through a snowbound landscape. The group's leader, a tall, stalwart lieutenant (Michael Forest), who played a similarly characterized forest ranger in Beast, is continually challenged by the disdainful sergeant (Wolff). Beast was first shown in October 1959, but eventually paired on a double bill with The Wasp Woman which, in line with the other films' Dakota link, premiered in Bismarck, North Dakota, on February 12, 1960. The previous month, Wolff was seen in three TV appearances, The Untouchables (January 7), The Lawless Years (January 19) and Rawhide (January 29). He also had the third-billed role of Baron, a nightclub owner who refuses to give another chance to alcoholic trumpet player Jack Klugman in The Twilight Zone episode "A Passage for Trumpet", broadcast on May 20.

In 1958, he appeared with another guest star, Strother Martin, in the episode "Pete Henke" of the NBC western series, Jefferson Drum, starring Jeff Richards as a crusading newspaper editor.

Moving to Europe 
In autumn 1960, Wolff traveled to Greece to co-star in another Roger Corman-directed, Charles B. Griffith-scripted low-budgeter, Atlas (released in May 1961). The title role was again assigned to the brawny Corman regular, Michael Forest, while the female lead went to Barboura Morris who, between 1957 and 1967, worked exclusively for Corman, appearing in thirteen of his films, including The Wasp Woman. In Atlas, Wolff was cast as the treacherous King Praximedes, a scene-stealing lead villain who was singled out by the few critics who reviewed the film. Sporting a short beard, Praximedes was alternately charming, witty, overbearing and menacing.

On Corman's advice, Wolff remained in Europe and became a well-known character actor in over fifty, mostly Italian-made, films of the 1960s, including crime/suspense "gialli" and Spaghetti Westerns. Early in his European career, he returned to Greece to essay a major, second-billed role in his most prestigious movie, the 1963 "Best Picture" Oscar nominee America, America, which producer-director-writer Elia Kazan filmed on location. As Vartan Damadian, the Armenian friend of the central character, played by Stathis Giallelis, a heavily mustached Wolff assayed a complex, multi-layered personality.

Wolff's numerous Italian films of the 1960s included The Four Days of Naples, Salvatore Giuliano, Il demonio, La morte risale a ieri sera, The Great Silence, God Forgives... I Don't!, One Dollar Too Many, and Once Upon a Time in the West. He was also seen in a few episodes of British-produced TV series, such as The Saint and The Baron.

Death 
Wolff committed suicide by cutting his throat in the bathroom of a residence in his Rome hotel room, a few steps from the Hilton hotel, at the age of 43 on December 12, 1971. Long the victim of a deep depressive crisis, the actor was separated from his wife Alice Campbell, who lived like him in Rome. According to one hypothesis, Wolff would have injured himself for the first time with a razor blade. Having dropped the blade from his hand, the actor would have taken a second one, with which he would have cut the carotid artery. This second injury caused a cerebral anemia that led to his death in a short time.

His body was found by a 24-year-old Austrian friend on the same day, and police said he had slashed his throat. It was speculated that the unrequited love for the young woman might have contributed to Wolff's fatal act, already suffering from a nervous breakdown for some time, after his wife had left him for another man.

His final two Italian-made films, Milan Caliber 9 and When Women Lost Their Tails were released posthumously in 1972. His voice in the English-language version of Milan Caliber 9 was dubbed in by his frequent co-star and roommate at the time of his death Michael Forest.

Selected filmography 

Kathy O' (1958) – Man (uncredited)
I Mobster (1959) – Man (uncredited)
The Wild and the Innocent (1959) – Henchman
The Wasp Woman (1959) – First Delivery Man
Beast from Haunted Cave (1959) – Alexander Ward
Ski Troop Attack (1960) – Sgt. Potter
Twilight Zone (1960) – Baron
The Subterraneans (1960) – Bearded Man (uncredited)
The Runaway (1961) – Wetback Vagrant (uncredited)
Atlas (1961) – Proximates the Tyrant
Salvatore Giuliano (1962) – Gaspare Pisciotta
The Four Days of Naples (1962) – Salvatore (uncredited)
The Verona Trial (1963) – Count Galeazzo Ciano
Il demonio (1963) – Antonio
America America (1963) – Vartan Damadian
Un commerce tranquille (1964) – Ginger
Via Veneto (1964)
Amori pericolosi (1964) – Il marito (segments "Il passo" and "La ronda")
Situation Hopeless... But Not Serious (1965) – Quartermaster Master Sergeant
Judith (1966) – Eli
Agent 3S3, Massacre in the Sun (1966) – Ivan Mikhailovic
Ringo, the Mark of Vengeance (1966) – Trikie Ferguson
A Few Dollars for Django (1966) – Jim / Trevor Norton
Treasure of San Gennaro (1966) – Joe
Non faccio la guerra, faccio l'amore (1966) – Charlie Morgan
A Stranger in Town (1967) – Aguilar
The Million Dollar Countdown (1967) – Paul Lefèvre
Il tempo degli avvoltoi (1967) – Joshua Tracy
The Stranger Returns (1967) – El Plein (English version, voice, uncredited)
God Forgives... I Don't! (1967) – Bill San Antonio
Anyone Can Play (1968) – Cesare, Paola's husband
Sardinia Kidnapped (1968) – Osilo
Villa Rides (1968) – Ramirez
One Dollar Too Many (1968) – Edwin Kean
The Great Silence (1968) – Sheriff Gideon Burnett
Once Upon a Time in the West (1968) – Brett McBain
The Libertine (1968) – Dr. Giulio, the dentist
Kill Them All and Come Back Alone (1968) – Captain Lynch
Ecce Homo (1968) – Quentin
Eat It (1968) – Commendatore / Mister Eat it
I dannati della Terra (1969) – Fausto
La battaglia del deserto (1969) – Red Wiley
Carnal Circuit (1969) – Frank Donovan
Barbagia (1969) – Spina
Sartana the Gravedigger (1969) – Buddy Ben
L'amica (1969) – Guido Nervi
 (1969) – Vallauri
Metello (1970) – Betto
La morte risale a ieri sera (1970) – Duca Lamberti
Corbari (1970) – Ulianov
The Lickerish Quartet (1970) – Castle owner
When Women Had Tails (1970) – Grr
Trasplante de un cerebro (1970) – Dr. Chambers
The Beloved (1971) – Hector
Cold Eyes of Fear (1971) – Arthur Welt
Death Walks on High Heels (1971) – Dr. Robert Matthews
Milan Caliber 9 (1972)  – Commissioner
When Women Lost Their Tails (1972) – Grr (final film role)

References

External links 
 

1928 births
1971 deaths
1971 suicides
20th-century American male actors
American expatriates in Italy
American male film actors
American male television actors
American people of German descent
Male Spaghetti Western actors
Male actors from San Francisco
Suicides by sharp instrument in Italy
UCLA Film School alumni